The 2017 All-Ireland Intermediate Ladies' Football Championship was a knock-out competition in the game of Ladies' Gaelic football played by women in Ireland. The series of games are organised by Ladies' Gaelic Football Association (Irish :Cumann Peil Gael na mBan)) and were played during the summer months with the All-Ireland Final being played on 24 September at Croke Park.

The competition was won by Tipperary who defeated Tyrone in the final by 1-13 to 1-10, Tipperary were captained by Samantha Lambert.	
It was the second time Tipperary had won the competition after also winning in 2008. The competition was sponsored by Lidl and  TG4 with the final shown live on TG4.

Quarter-finals

 Meath 3-15 Clare 4-11
 Tyrone 4-16 Leitrim 1-10
 Sligo 3-8 Roscommon 1-6
 Tipperary 2-15 Wexford 3-11

Semi-finals

Final

References

External links
Fixtures and Results

All-Ireland Intermediate Ladies' Football Championship
Inter